Fernando Henrique Boldrin (born 23 February 1989) is a Brazilian professional footballer who plays as a attacking midfielder for TFF First League club Samsunspor.

Career

Early career
Boldrin played as a junior for FC Slovan Liberec in the Czech Republic, but spent the first part of his senior career in the lower leagues of native Brazil.

Concordia Chiajna
In 2014, aged 25, Boldrin was brought to Romanian club Concordia Chiajna by coach Marius Șumudică. He ended the Liga I season with 32 matches and 6 goals, earning interest from better ranked clubs after scoring a double against defending champions Steaua București in May 2015. "The Eagles" finished on the 12th place, narrowly avoiding relegation.

Astra Giurgiu
During the 2015 summer transfer window, Boldrin signed a contract with FC Astra Giurgiu, rejoining his former Concordia coach Marius Șumudică. On 26 July, he scored his first goal in a 2–1 victory against fellow Liga I team Universitatea Craiova. The following week Boldrin netted a goal in the UEFA Europa League third qualifying round's first leg against West Ham United, helping his team obtain a 2–2 away draw at Boleyn Ground. Astra eventually qualified further, and he scored again against AZ Alkmaar in the first leg of the play-off round.

Boldrin, who ended the campaign with 42 matches and seven goals all competitions comprised, helped Astra achieve its first league championship title in their history. He was also a starter in the 2016 Romanian Supercup 1–0 win over CFR Cluj.

FCSB
On 12 August 2016, FC Steaua București announced the transfer of Boldrin for an undisclosed fee, with the player penning a four-year contract with the club.

Kayerispor
Fernando joined Kayserispor in 2017. He played 23 matches in his debut season in the Turkish Süper Lig, with Kayserispor avoiding relegation.

Çaykur Rizespor
After one season with Kayserispor, Boldrin joined Çaykur Rizespor, also in the Turkish Super Lig, on a season-long loan deal.

On 7 August 2019, he joined Çaykur Rizespor on a permanent three-year deal.

Style of play
Regarded as a good free kick taker with great technical ability, Boldrin operates primarily as a central midfielder and is capable of aiding his team both in attack and defence.

Career statistics

Club

Honours
Astra Giurgiu
Liga I: 2015–16
Supercupa României: 2016

Individual
Gazeta Sporturilor Foreign Player of the Year in Romania: 2016

References

External links

Footballers from São Paulo (state)
1989 births
Living people
Brazilian footballers
Association football midfielders
Liga I players
Süper Lig players
TFF First League players
Associação Portuguesa de Desportos players
Guaratinguetá Futebol players
CS Concordia Chiajna players
FC Astra Giurgiu players
FC Steaua București players
Kayserispor footballers
Çaykur Rizespor footballers
Samsunspor footballers
Brazilian expatriate footballers
Expatriate footballers in Romania
Brazilian expatriate sportspeople in Romania
Expatriate footballers in Turkey
Brazilian expatriate sportspeople in Turkey